Austin is an unincorporated community in Sevier County, Utah, United States.

References

Unincorporated communities in Sevier County, Utah
Unincorporated communities in Utah